Sin Chol-Bom (born 15 June 1990, Nampo) is a North Korean weightlifter. He competed at the 2012 Summer Olympics in the Men's 56 kg, finishing 10th.

References

North Korean male weightlifters
Living people
Olympic weightlifters of North Korea
Weightlifters at the 2012 Summer Olympics
Weightlifters at the 2018 Asian Games
Universiade medalists in weightlifting
Universiade gold medalists for North Korea
Asian Games competitors for North Korea

People from Nampo
1990 births
21st-century North Korean people